"Somewhere I Belong" is a song by American rock band Linkin Park. It was released to US radio on February 24, 2003, as the first single from their second studio album, Meteora (2003), and is the album's third track. It entered the top ten on several music charts, including the New Zealand Singles Chart, where it peaked at  1 in April 2003.

Commercial performance
Warner Bros. Records officially released "Somewhere I Belong" to American rock radio formats on February 24, 2003. The song debuted at No. 47 on the US Billboard Hot 100, peaked at No. 32 during its 15th week on the chart, and remained on the listing until its 20th week. It also topped the Billboard Mainstream Rock Tracks and Modern Rock Tracks charts. In Canada, the song reached the top five on the Canadian Singles Chart, peaking at No. 3.

"Somewhere I Belong" was released in Australia and the United Kingdom on March 17, 2003. In New Zealand, the song debuted at number 33 on April 6, 2003, and jumped to number one the following week, becoming Linkin Park's most successful single there. It entered the top 10 in the Czech Republic, Hungary, Ireland, and the United Kingdom, and it was a top-20 success in Australia, Austria, Germany, Italy, the Netherlands, and Sweden. It additionally reached the top 40 in France and Belgium (Flanders and Wallonia).

Music video
The video was directed by the band's turntablist, Joseph Hahn. It presents the band playing the song in front of a fire, with occasional shots of Chester Bennington and Mike Shinoda in front of a waterfall with what appears to be monks around them. The doors in what is supposedly Bennington's room have the Chinese characters for fire and water, which possibly represent the waterfall and burning fire behind Shinoda while rapping.

During the video, on a dresser sits several props, most notably, Master Grade Gunpla models of the MSN-04 Sazabi from Mobile Suit Gundam: Char's Counterattack, XXXG-00W0 Wing Gundam Zero (EW Version) from Gundam Wing: Endless Waltz, and RX-78GP01-Fb Gundam "Zephyranthes" Full Burnern from Mobile Suit Gundam 0083: Stardust Memory. At the last time they sing the chorus, the bed sets on fire, and forms the Hybrid Theory Soldier. Near the ending of the video, tall, long-legged, tusked creatures that were on a painting (reminiscent of Salvador Dalí's The Elephants and The Temptation of St. Anthony) behind Chester's bed march past, even at one point the creature paintings seemed to move before stopping again. It was awarded as Best Rock Video at the 2003 MTV Video Music Awards, and was the first music video broadcast on Fuse TV. MTV's James Montgomery named the video as Linkin Park's fifth best, saying that while the video is "massive", he said "it's the minimal touches that make it one of their all-time best", and called the end result a "stirring, powerful piece".

As of February 2023, the music video for "Somewhere I Belong" has over 260 million views on YouTube.

Track listing
CD single

7-inch vinyl

Personnel
Linkin Park
 Chester Bennington – lead vocals, additional guitar
 Mike Shinoda – rap vocals, rhythm guitar, piano, sampler
 Brad Delson – lead guitar
 Dave "Phoenix" Farrell – bass guitar
 Joe Hahn – turntables, samplers
 Rob Bourdon – drums
Production
 Don Gilmore – producer
 Linkin Park – producer

Charts

Weekly charts

Year-end charts

Certifications

Release history

In other media
 The song was one of the three songs off of Meteora that played during The Lord of the Rings: The Two Towers''' win at the 2003 MTV Movie Awards. "Somewhere I Belong" played during "Best Movie" while "From the Inside" and "Faint" appeared during the nominee montage for "Best On-Screen Team" and "Best Action Sequence" respectively.
 Conservative commentator Mark Levin's son selected the song's instrumental as the main bumper music theme for his father's radio talk show.
 The song was also featured in a profile video for Jamaican sprinter Usain Bolt at the 2008 Beijing Olympics.
 The instrumental version played in the opening video for the AST Dew Tour.
 In January 2011, "Somewhere I Belong" was released in a Linkin Park DLC pack for Rock Band 3.
 The song was used for a promo of the Nature entitled "Chasing Big Cats".
 On November 18, 2013, a 2002 demo of this song, titled as "Pretty Birdy", is chosen and featured on LP Underground XIII''.
Israel Adesanya used the song as his Walkout song during UFC 263.

References

2002 songs
2003 singles
Linkin Park songs
Number-one singles in New Zealand
Songs written by Mike Shinoda
Warner Records singles